James Daryl Hambro (born 22 March 1949) is a British heir, banker, businessman and philanthropist.

Early life 
James Hambro was born on 22 March 1949. His father, Jocelyn Hambro, was chair of Hambros Bank from 1965 to 1972. His mother was Ann Silvia Muir. His paternal great-grandfather, Carl Joachim Hambro, was a Danish immigrant to England who founded the Hambros Bank.

He was educated at Eton College. He graduated from the Harvard Business School.

Career
Hambro served as the Executive Director of the family business, Hambros Bank, from 1972 to 1985. He co-founded JO Hambro & Company, JO Hambro Investment Management Ltd (now Waverton Investment Management) Hambro Magan, a mergers and acquisitions boutique sold to Nat West, JO Hambro Capital Management Ltd, an institutional fund management company, now part of Pendal, an Australian fund group  . He founded James Hambro & Partners in 2010, and serves as its chairman.

Hambro has served on the board of directors of Primary Health Properties from 1996 to 2015. He was the Chairman of Hansteen Holdings from 2005 to 2017. He is a director of Circle Property PLC and I Hennig & Co.

Philanthropy
Hambro is the former Governor and Deputy Chair of Peabody Trust, Chair of The Henry Smith Charity, and currently Chair of Guide Dogs for the Blind.

Personal life
He married Diana Cherry in 1981. They have three daughters: Rachel, Daisy and Lucy. They reside in Kimberley, Norfolk. He is a member of White's and the Royal West Norfolk Golf Club.

References

Living people
People educated at Eton College
Harvard Business School alumni
Bankers from London
Philanthropists from London
British people of Danish descent
British people of German-Jewish descent
Danish nobility
Barons of Denmark
James
1949 births
People from Kimberley, Norfolk